Dogrel is the debut studio album by Dublin post-punk band Fontaines D.C. It was released through Partisan Records on 12 April 2019 on cassette, CD, digital download, and vinyl formats. The album was nominated for Album of The Year at the Choice Music Prize and Mercury Prize in 2019.

Critical reception 

Upon its release, Dogrel received universal acclaim from contemporary music critics. On review aggregator website Metacritic, Dogrel has an average weighted rating of 86 out of 100 indicating "universal acclaim" based on 17 critics' reviews. On review aggregator website AnyDecentMusic?, the album has an average rating of 8.5 out of 10.

Ben Beaumont-Thomas, writing for The Guardian, praised the lyricism of the album, stating that "this is the kind of songwriting quality that bands can take years to reach, or never reach at all: brilliant, top to bottom." Tom Connock of NME stated that "the Irish troubadours come good on a debut album that offers both a storyteller's narrative voice and a snarling new vision of youthful disillusionment." Writing for The Skinny, Robin Murray praised the multitude of emotions the album evokes, saying that it "feels both overwhelming and tender, caustic and soothing, a blast of working class rage grown articulate while retaining its primal howl."

Writing for Pitchfork, Stuart Berman contrasted both the band and record to contemporary British post-punk outfits, IDLES and Shame, saying that "Fontaines D.C. are fueled by neither IDLES' revolutionary fervor nor Shame's festering disgust. They're not raging against the current state of affairs as much as lamenting the local communities and culture in danger of being steamrolled by the march of modernity." He went on to comment that "their origin story is so quaint and anachronistic, it verges on flaneur cosplay, with the quintet reportedly bonding over a mutual love of Joycean poetry and pub nights spent scribbling out and reciting verses to one another. That old-school approach finds its analog in a raw, robust twin-guitar attack that's more jangly than jagged, nodding to ‘60s garage, surf, and early rock‘n’roll while projecting a confrontational fury. As such, Fontaines D.C. are very much a post-punk band reclaiming a certain pre-punk innocence."

The album was nominated for the 2019 Mercury Prize and the Choice Music Prize.

Track listing
All tracks are written and performed by Fontaines D.C.

Personnel
Credits adapted from the liner notes of Dogrel.

Fontaines D.C.
 Grian Chatten – vocals , tambourine  
 Carlos O'Connell – guitar , baritone guitar , piano , Buchla Music Easel , backing vocals 
 Conor Curley – guitar , baritone guitar , Nashville guitar , chord organ , backing vocals 
 Tom Coll – drums , tambourine , miscellaneous percussion 
 Conor Deegan – bass guitar , piano , baritone guitar , surf guitar , Jupiter synth , backing vocals 

Additional personnel
 Dan Carey – production, mixing, swarmatron , arpeggiator 
 Alexis Smith – engineering
 Christina Wright – mastering

Artwork
 Bruce Davidson – photography 
 Richard Dumas – photography 
 Matt de Jong – design

Charts

Release history

References

2019 debut albums
Fontaines D.C. albums
Partisan Records albums
Albums produced by Dan Carey (record producer)